Shindig was a framework for web-based applications. It is an open source project which began in December 2007 to provide a reference implementation for the OpenSocial standard, but was retired in October 2015. The software contains both server-side and client-side code. Once the project is mature, an installation of this product will be capable of rendering OpenSocial gadgets in a web browser.

Features 
In the announcement for Shindig's first code commit, four primary features of Shindig were cited:

 Gadget Container JavaScript—core JavaScript foundation for general gadget functionality. This JavaScript manages security, communication, UI layout, and feature extensions, such as the OpenSocial API.
 Gadget Server—an open source version of gmodules.com, which is used to render the gadget XML into JavaScript and HTML for the container to expose via the container JavaScript.
 OpenSocial Container JavaScript—JavaScript environment that sits on top of the Gadget Container JavaScript and provides OpenSocial specific functionality (profiles, friends, activities).
 OpenSocial Gateway Server—an open source implementation of the server interface to container-specific information, including the OpenSocial REST APIs, with clear extension points so others can connect it to their own backends. It helps for open social sources.

See also 

 OpenSocial
 Web widget

References

External links 

 OpenSocial Foundation Homepage

Social software